Spessart is a range of low wooded mountains in Germany.

It may also refer to:

 Spessart, Rhineland-Palatinate, town in Germany
 Spessart (A1442), tanker of the German Navy
 10951 Spessart, main-belt asteroid

See also
Gutsbezirk Spessart, unincorporated area in Germany